The Cautionary Tales of Mark Oliver Everett is the eleventh studio album by American indie rock band Eels, released on April 21, 2014 by record label E Works. The album was produced by frontman Mark Oliver Everett.

Reception 

The Cautionary Tales of Mark Oliver Everett received generally positive reviews from critics. On Metacritic, the album has a weighted average score of 70 out of 100 based on 23 reviews, indicating "generally favorable reviews".

Phil Mongredien of The Observer wrote: "The subject matter may not be as harrowing as the real-life inspiration for some of his earlier work (most notably Electro-Shock Blues), but this is still a powerful and emotionally coherent set." Lior Phillips of Consequence of Sound was unfavorable, writing: "What The Cautionary Tales needs is a prudent pruning. This album struggles to appear deeper than a common puddle, and while E's previous penchant for sharing has given him a brilliant book of songs from which to draw, I wonder how long he'll stay floating on the surface."

Track listing 
Written by E, except as noted
"Where I'm At" (E, arr. by The Chet and P-Boo) – 1:42
"Parallels" – 3:16
"Lockdown Hurricane" (E; arr. by P-Boo) – 3:30
"Agatha Chang" (E; arr. by P-Boo) – 3:28
"A Swallow in the Sun" (E, The Chet; arr. by The Chet) – 3:37
"Where I'm From" (E, P-Boo) – 2:49
"Series of Misunderstandings" – 3:23
"Kindred Spirit" (E, P-Boo) – 2:54
"Gentlemen's Choice" (E, P-Boo; arr. by P-Boo) – 2:36
"Dead Reckoning" (E, P-Boo; arr. by P-Boo) – 2:29
"Answers" (E; arr. by P-Boo) – 2:39
"Mistakes of My Youth" (E, The Chet; arr. by The Chet) – 4:57
"Where I'm Going" (E; arr. by The Chet) – 3:04

Deluxe Edition bonus disc
"To Dig It"
"Lonely Lockdown Hurricane" (E; orchestral arrangement by P-Boo)
"Bow Out" (E, P-Boo)
"A Good Deal"
"Good Morning Bright Eyes"
"Millicent Don't Blame Yourself" (E, Koool G Murder)
"Thanks I Guess" (E, P-Boo)
"On the Ropes" (Live WNYC) (E, The Chet, Koool G Murder)
"Accident Prone" (Live WNYC) (E, P-Boo)
"I'm Your Brave Little Soldier (Live WNYC)
"Fresh Feeling" (Live KCRW) (E, Koool G Murder)
"Trouble with Dreams" (Live KCRW)
"Oh Well" (Live KCRW) (Peter Green)

Personnel 
Eels
 The Chet
 E
 Knuckles
 Koool G Murder
 P-Boo

Charts

Weekly charts

Year-end charts

References

External links 

 

2014 albums
Albums produced by Mark Oliver Everett
Eels (band) albums
Vagrant Records albums